The 1890–91 British Home Championship was an international football tournament between the British Home Nations. Despite strong showings from all four teams, England eventually won the trophy with victories in all three games including, as at the 1890 and 1892 competitions, matches against Wales and Ireland played simultaneously. Ireland notched up one of their highest ever wins, 7–2 over Wales, but still only finished third, whilst the Welsh ran Scotland close in their encounter, but ultimately scored zero points.

Scotland and Ireland began the tournament with the Scots securing a narrow win in Glasgow. They extended their lead in Wrexham despite Wales playing well and nearly taking a draw, eventually going down 3–4. England then played their double on 7 March, scoring an aggregate of 10–2 as both the amateur and professional sides easily won their games over Wales and Ireland. Ireland and Wales played for pride in their final game, Ireland routing the Welsh in Belfast and finishing five goals ahead. In the tournament decider in Blackburn, England were too strong for the Scots in a close game and the result was an England victory, giving them the trophy undisputed.

Table

Results

Winning squad

References

British
British Home Championships
Brit
Brit
Home
Brit
Home
1890–91 in Irish association football